Cyrillia ephesina is a species of sea snail, a marine gastropod mollusk in the family Raphitomidae.

Description
The length of the shell varies between 5.8 mm and 7.5 mm.

Distribution
This marine species occurs widely in the Mediterranean Sea (France, Croatia, Greece, Italy) and in the Aegean Sea.

References

External links
Biodiversity Journal 8(1): 205-210
 Fassio, G.; Russini, V.; Pusateri, F.; Giannuzzi-Savelli, R.; Høisæter, T.; Puillandre, N.; Modica, M. V.; Oliverio, M. (2019). An assessment of Raphitoma and allied genera (Neogastropoda: Raphitomidae). Journal of Molluscan Studies. 85(4): 414-425

ephesina
Gastropods described in 2017